Alticorpus peterdaviesi is a species of fish in the family Cichlidae. It is endemic to Lake Malawi.  It is found in the southern part of the lake, in areas where the substrate consists of "diatom ooze" and diatoms probably form the major part of its diet.

Etymology
The specific name honours Peter Davies, an exporter of live fish from Lake Malawi who provided great assistance to the authors.

References

 Kazembe, J., Makocho, P. & Mailosi, A. 2005.  Alticorpus peterdaviesi.   2006 IUCN Red List of Threatened Species.   Downloaded on 3 August 2007.

Fish of Malawi
peterdaviesi
Taxa named by Warren E. Burgess
Taxa named by Herbert R. Axelrod
Fish described in 1973
Taxonomy articles created by Polbot
Fish of Lake Malawi